2018 Thai League 4 Northeastern Region is the 10th season of the League competition since its establishment in 2009. It is in the 4th tier of the Thai football league system.

Changes from Last Season

Promoted Clubs

Promoted from the 2017 Thailand Amateur League Northeastern Region
 Surin Sugar Khong Chee Mool

Relegated Clubs

Relegated to the 2018 Thailand Amateur League Northeastern Region
 Mukdahan Chaiyuenyong

Expansion Clubs
 Roi Et United couldn't pay late performing fee. it cause to don't pass Club-licensing football club. This team is banned 2 years and Relegated to 2020 Thailand Amateur League Northeastern Region.

Renamed Clubs
 Buriram United B was renamed to Buriram United U-23
 Khong Chee Mool was renamed to Surin Sugar Khong Chee Mool

Reserving Clubs
 Nongbua Pitchaya U-23 is Nongbua Pitchaya Reserving this team which join Northeastern Region first time.
 Ubon UMT United U-23 is Ubon UMT United Reserving this team which join Northeastern Region first time.

Returned Clubs
 Khon Kaen United was returned to play thailand professional league because This team is acquitted from Thailand Court of justice decide. FA Thailand order this team to restart at 2018 Thai League 4 Northeastern Region.,

Teams

Stadium and locations

League table

Results by match played

Results

Season statistics

Top scorers
As of 26 August 2018.

Hat-tricks

Attendance

Attendance by home match played

Source: Thai League 4
Note: Some error of T4 official match report 8 July 2018 (Mahasarakham 1–0 Mashare Chaiyaphum).
 Some error of T4 official match report 8 July 2018 (Khonkaen United 7–0 Ubon UMT United U-23).
 Some error of T4 official match report 1 August 2018 (Mahasarakham 0–0 Muang Loei United).

See also
 2018 Thai League
 2018 Thai League 2
 2018 Thai League 3
 2018 Thai League 4
 2018 Thailand Amateur League
 2018 Thai FA Cup
 2018 Thai League Cup
 2018 Thailand Champions Cup

References

External links
Thai League 4
http://www.thailandsusu.com/webboard/index.php?topic=388919.0
https://web.archive.org/web/20180107103557/http://www.smmsport.com/news.php?category=74

4